Allen Park Public Schools is a school district in Allen Park, Michigan, United States.

The school district first opened Lapham School north of Southfield on Horger Street. It was a K-8 school, and students would end up going to a Detroit public high school after Lapham.

They later opened Allen Park High on Champaign Rd. in 1950. They also built five Elementary Schools and one middle school in the 1960s.

North Junior High was on Allen Rd. in front of Pretty Family Park, and later became an office building. 

The 5 Elementary schools were-
 Sudman, on Philomene Blvd. (1946-1984) 
 Riley, on Moore (Later became Community School for students needing special education, and the location of school district)
 Bennie, Next to Allen Park High School
 Lindemann, on Carter near Wick
 Arno, near Markese.

The school district eventually closed Lapham and turned it into the school district office and community center. The school district later closed Sudman, tearing it down and leaving the property as a public park named, Sudman Park.

They built a middle school on Vine, near Lincoln Park, and closed the middle school on Allen Rd. The old middle school was sold and rented out as an office building. This building still has carvings on the outside doorways from the former school, such as the word "auditorium" on the left-hand side door. The current principal is Patrick Donohue and the current assistant principal is Bruce Andrews.

The district later closed and tore down the Lapham building and closed Riley, turning it into the district office and the school for students needing special education.(as earlier mentioned above)

Former Lindemann Elementary principal Michael Darga is the superintendent of the school district.

As of June 2022, Riley has ceased operations as special education school and serves solely as the district office due to budget cuts.

Board of education
The district is governed by a seven-member Board of Education. The Board's President is Gordon Miller, and Vice President of Operations is Michael J. Klein

References

http://www.thenewsherald.com/news/allen-park-middle-school-principal-resigns-no-reason-given/article_6594e9ac-af1b-11e9-ad71-a72de93d62fd.html
https://www.allenparkschools.com/apps/pages/index.jsp?uREC_ID=970201&type=d&pREC_ID=1289515

External links

Allen Park Public Schools official school district home page

Education in Wayne County, Michigan
School districts in Michigan